Ken Rosewall defeated Lew Hoad 4–6, 6–2, 6–3, 6–3 in the final to win the men's singles tennis title at the 1956 U.S. National Championships.

Seeds
The seeded players are listed below. Ken Rosewall is the champion; others show the round in which they were eliminated.

 Lew Hoad (finalist)
 Ken Rosewall (champion)
 Ham Richardson (quarterfinals)
 Vic Seixas (semifinals)
 Neale Fraser (semifinals)
 Ashley Cooper (quarterfinals)
 Ulf Schmidt (third round)
 Dick Savitt (quarterfinals)

Draw

Key
 Q = Qualifier
 WC = Wild card
 LL = Lucky loser
 r = Retired

Final eight

Earlier rounds

Section 1

Section 2

Section 3

Section 4

Section 5

Section 6

Section 7

Section 8

References

External links
 1956 U.S. National Championships on ITFtennis.com, the source for this draw
 Association of Tennis Professionals (ATP) – 1956 U.S. Championships Men's Singles draw

Men's Singles
U.S. National Championships (tennis) by year – Men's singles